Hedemann is a surname. Notable people with the surname include:

Christian Hedemann (1852–1932), Danish mechanical engineer
Hans Hedemann (1792–1859), Danish officer
Knut Hedemann (1922–2011), Norwegian diplomat
Rudolf Hedemann (1889–1978), Norwegian politician

See also
Heidemann